was a Japanese film and stage actor. He appeared in more than 100 films.

Career
Hoping to become a film director, Shimojō traveled to Tokyo in 1935 but ended up joining a theater troupe, debuting on stage in 1936. He made his film debut in 1940, but continued on stage well after World War II, primarily as a member of Gekidan Mingei. He was most known, however, for playing the uncle of Torajiro Kuruma in the long-running Otoko wa Tsurai yo series.

Selected filmography

Film

Television

References

External links 

1915 births
2004 deaths
Japanese male film actors
Japanese male stage actors
Japanese expatriates in Korea